John Dowie (12 December 1955 – 22 January 2016) was a football midfielder, who played in the Football League and Scottish Football League during the 1970s and 1980s.

Dowie was at Rangers as a schoolboy but did not make the grade there and moved to Fulham in 1973, being at the club when they reached the 1975 FA Cup Final, although he did not play in the game.

In 1977, he left to join Celtic, making his debut for them on 10 September 1977 against Rangers. He also appeared for the Bhoys against Rangers in the 1978 Scottish League Cup Final. He did not make an appearance for the club in 1978-79 and left to join Doncaster Rovers in April 1979.

Dowie played a total of 25 senior games for Rovers, scoring 2 goals. He next moved to play for Clyde, making his league debut in the 1981-82 season. After Clyde he moved to Australia to play for the Doveton club.

References

1955 births
2016 deaths
English Football League players
Scottish Football League players
North American Soccer League (1968–1984) players
Rangers F.C. players
Fulham F.C. players
Celtic F.C. players
Houston Hurricane players
Doncaster Rovers F.C. players
Clyde F.C. players
Association football midfielders
Footballers from Hamilton, South Lanarkshire
Expatriate soccer players in the United States
Scottish footballers
Scottish expatriate sportspeople in the United States
Scottish expatriate footballers